San Pedro Municipal Ferry Building is a former Los Angeles Harbor Department ferry terminal building located at Sixth Street at Harbor Boulevard in the community of San Pedro in Los Angeles, California.

The historic landmark building now houses the Los Angeles Maritime Museum.

History
The Municipal Ferry Building was built in 1941 as a Works Project Administration (WPA) project, built at Berth 84. It was designed in the Streamline Moderne style by architect Derwood Lydell Irvin of the Los Angeles Harbor Department.   It has a five-story octagonal clock tower. Its "sister ferry terminal" was across the main channel at Berth 234, also Irvin designed in the Streamline Moderne and built by the WPA in 1941.

It was a working ferry terminal from 1941 to 1963, for the ferry connecting San Pedro and Terminal Island in the Los Angeles Harbor. During those years, the double-decked ferries "Islander" and "Ace" transported thousands of passengers and automobiles to and from the tuna canneries, docks, shipyards, and military bases on Terminal Island.

In 1963, the Vincent Thomas Bridge was completed, connecting mainland San Pedro to Terminal Island, and the ferry service became obsolete. The ferry service was terminated on 14 November, and the bridge opened on 15 November.

The San Pedro terminal building was used for many years as an office building by the Los Angeles Harbor Department. The ferry terminal building on the Terminal Island side was demolished in 1972 to expand cargo operations.

Museum
As the ferry building began to deteriorate, citizens of San Pedro sought to have it restored.  They succeeded in having the building designated as a Los Angeles Historic-Cultural Monument (no. 146) in 1975.

Beginning in 1976 the building was restored (exterior) and remodeled (interior) into the Los Angeles Maritime Museum, which opened in 1979.  It is the largest maritime museum on the West Coast.

The building was listed on the National Register of Historic Places in 1996.

Media
Both the exterior and interior of the Municipal Ferry Building were featured in the 1947 film The Street With No Name.

See also
 List of Los Angeles Historic-Cultural Monuments in the Harbor area
 List of Registered Historic Places in Los Angeles

References

External links

 Big Orange Landmarks Blog: Los Angeles Historic-Cultural Monument No. 146 — Municipal Ferry Building — with images.
 Official Los Angeles Maritime Museum website
 LAPL.org:  "History of the Los Angeles Maritime Museum"

Ferry terminals in California
San Pedro, Los Angeles
Government buildings in Los Angeles
Los Angeles Harbor Region
Terminal Island
Maritime history of California
Government buildings completed in 1941
Transport infrastructure completed in 1941
Los Angeles Historic-Cultural Monuments
Ferry terminals on the National Register of Historic Places
Government buildings on the National Register of Historic Places in Los Angeles
Transportation buildings and structures on the National Register of Historic Places in California
1941 establishments in California
1963 disestablishments in California
Maritime museums in California
Museums in Los Angeles
1940s architecture in the United States
Works Progress Administration in California
PWA Moderne architecture in California
Streamline Moderne architecture in California
Transportation buildings and structures in Los Angeles County, California